Jamyang Namgial (born 3 June 1985) is an Indian skier. Namgial participated in his first Olympic event at the 2010 Winter Olympics, competing in the Men's Giant Slalom event of Alpine skiing. He also participated in the 2007 Asian Winter Games.

Namgial served in the Ladakh Scouts regiment of the Indian Army.

Alpine skiing results
All results are sourced from the International Ski Federation (FIS).

Olympic results

World Championship results

See also
Alpine skiing at the 2010 Winter Olympics
2007 Asian Winter Games

References

External links
 

1985 births
Alpine skiers at the 2010 Winter Olympics
Living people
Olympic alpine skiers of India
Indian male alpine skiers
People from Leh district
Skiers from Ladakh
Indian Army personnel
Alpine skiers at the 2007 Asian Winter Games
Alpine skiers at the 2011 Asian Winter Games
South Asian Winter Games silver medalists for India
South Asian Winter Games medalists in alpine skiing